D. tropica can refer to the following species.  The specific epithet  refers to the tropics.

 Datroniella tropica, a crust fungus in the genus Datroniella
 Desmarestia tropica, tropical acidweed
 Drepanosticta tropica, the dark-shouldered cornuted shadowdamsel